Luciana Daniela Gómez Montans (born 28 July 2000) is a Uruguayan professional footballer who plays as a midfielder for Brazilian Série A1 side Atlético Mineiro and the Uruguay women's national team. She is also a futsal player who plays as a defender.

Club career
Gómez has played for Colón, Liverpool and Nacional in Uruguay.

International career
Gómez made her senior debut for Uruguay on 12 June 2021 in a 5–1 friendly home win over Puerto Rico.

International goals

References 

2000 births
Living people
Uruguayan women's footballers
Women's association football midfielders
Club Nacional de Football players
Clube Atlético Mineiro (women) players
Campeonato Brasileiro de Futebol Feminino Série A1 players
Uruguay women's international footballers
Uruguayan expatriate women's footballers
Uruguayan expatriate sportspeople in Brazil
Expatriate women's footballers in Brazil
Uruguayan women's futsal players